PGIB could stand for:
 Undecaprenyl-diphosphooligosaccharide-protein glycotransferase, an enzyme
 Progressive Group for Independent Business